Hermann II of Baden (c. 1060 – 7 October 1130) was the first to use the title Margrave of Baden, after the family seat at Castle Hohenbaden. This castle is in the present day town of Baden-Baden.

Life
Hermann was the son of Hermann I of Baden and Judit of Backnang-Sulichgau. He was ruler of the March of Verona from 1112 until 1130.

He styled himself Dominus in Baden, comes Brisgaviae, marchio Verona. In English, his titles were: Lord in Baden, Count of Brisgau, Margrave of Verona. Around 1070 Hermann began to build Castle Hohenbaden on top of the remains of an old Celtic structure. After the structure was completed in 1112, he gave himself the title Margrave of Baden.

He rebuilt the Augustine monastery that his father had built in Backnang in 1123. Hermann was laid to rest in the monastery with the inscription:

"In this tomb lies the Margrave Hermann of Baden, who was the founder of this monastery and temple. He died in the year thousand increased by hundred and three times ten fronm the time on when the pious virgin bore . When he was transferred here along with his descendancy, fifteen hundred years had passed, thereto ten onandall three."

Family and children
Hermann II married Judit of Hohenberg and had the following children:
Hermann III (d. January 16, 1160)
Judith (d. 1162), married Ulrich I of Carinthia (d. 1144)

References

Florian Lamke: Die frühen Markgrafen von Baden, die Hessonen und die Zähringer. In: Zeitschrift für die Geschichte des Oberrheins. 154 (2006) S. 21–42.

Margraves of Baden
1060s births
1130 deaths
Year of birth uncertain
Burials at Backnang Abbey